Suriyong Hemint (born 10 March 1948) is a former Thai cyclist. He competed in the individual road race at the 1968 Summer Olympics.

References

External links
 

1948 births
Living people
Suriyong Hemint
Suriyong Hemint
Cyclists at the 1968 Summer Olympics
Suriyong Hemint
Suriyong Hemint